Wallace County (standard abbreviation: WA) is a county located in the U.S. state of Kansas. Its county seat is Sharon Springs. As of the 2020 census, the county population was 1,512, making it the second-least populous county in Kansas (Greeley County is the least). The county was created in 1868 and named in honor of Brigadier general W.H.L. Wallace who was a veteran of the Mexican–American War and a casualty of the Battle of Shiloh. It is one of four Kansas counties to use the Mountain Time Zone rather than the Central Time Zone like the remainder of Kansas.

History

Early history

For many millennia, the Great Plains of North America was inhabited by nomadic Native Americans. From the 16th century to 18th century, the Kingdom of France claimed ownership of large parts of North America. In 1762, after the French and Indian War, France secretly ceded New France to Spain, per the Treaty of Fontainebleau.

19th century
In 1802, Spain returned most of the land to France, but keeping title to about 7,500 square miles. In 1803, most of the land for modern day Kansas was acquired by the United States from France as part of the 828,000 square mile Louisiana Purchase for 2.83 cents per acre.

In 1854, the Kansas Territory was organized, then in 1861 Kansas became the 34th U.S. state. In 1868, Wallace County was established.

Geography

Adjacent counties
 Sherman County (north)
 Logan County (east/Central Time border)
 Wichita County (southeast/Central Time border)
 Greeley County (south)
 Cheyenne County, Colorado (west)
 Kit Carson County, Colorado (northwest)

Demographics

As of the census of 2000, there were 1,749 people, 674 households, and 477 families residing in the county. The population density was 2 people per square mile (1/km2). There were 791 housing units at an average density of 1 per square mile (0/km2). The racial makeup of the county was 94.63% White, 0.63% Black or African American, 0.80% Native American, 0.17% Asian, 2.52% from other races, and 1.26% from two or more races. 4.80% of the population were Hispanic or Latino of any race.

There were 674 households, out of which 33.80% had children under the age of 18 living with them, 63.60% were married couples living together, 4.00% had a female householder with no husband present, and 29.20% were non-families. 27.60% of all households were made up of individuals, and 13.60% had someone living alone who was 65 years of age or older. The average household size was 2.56 and the average family size was 3.12.

In the county, the population was spread out, with 29.10% under the age of 18, 6.50% from 18 to 24, 23.60% from 25 to 44, 22.80% from 45 to 64, and 18.10% who were 65 years of age or older. The median age was 40 years. For every 100 females there were 99.00 males. For every 100 females age 18 and over, there were 99.40 males.

The median income for a household in the county was $33,000, and the median income for a family was $42,022. Males had a median income of $25,610 versus $18,333 for females. The per capita income for the county was $17,016. About 10.70% of families and 16.10% of the population were below the poverty line, including 24.50% of those under age 18 and 12.70% of those age 65 or over.

Government

Presidential elections

Wallace has long been one of the most overwhelmingly Republican of all the state's counties. Only two Democratic presidential nominees have ever won Wallace County – Woodrow Wilson in 1916 and Franklin D. Roosevelt in 1932. Since 1944 only three Democratic presidential candidates have won 31 percent of Wallace County's vote – Harry S. Truman in 1948, Lyndon Johnson in 1964 and Jimmy Carter in 1976 – whilst since 1980 only Michael Dukakis during the drought-affected 1988 election has obtained so much as seventeen percent for the Democratic Party. Indeed, in the 2016 election Hillary Clinton recorded less than six percent of the county's vote, whilst the last six Republican nominees have all exceeded 80 percent. In the 2012, 2016, and 2020 elections, Wallace was the only county in Kansas to give over 90% of the vote to the Republican nominee, namely Mitt Romney followed by Donald Trump.

Laws
Although the Kansas Constitution was amended in 1986 to allow the sale of alcoholic liquor by the individual drink with the approval of voters, Wallace County has remained a prohibition, or "dry", county, one of only three such counties remaining in the state.

Education

Unified school districts
 Wallace USD 241
 Weskan USD 242

Communities

Cities
 Sharon Springs
 Wallace

Unincorporated communities
† means a Census-Designated Place (CDP) by the United States Census Bureau.
 Weskan†

Townships
Wallace County is divided into four townships. None of the cities within the county are considered governmentally independent, and all figures for the townships include those of the cities. In the following table, the population center is the largest city (or cities) included in that township's population total, if it is of a significant size.

See also

References

Further reading

 Standard Atlas of Wallace County, Kansas; Geo. A. Ogle & Co; 42 pages; 1908.

External links

County
 
 Wallace County - Directory of Public Officials
Maps
 Wallace County Maps: Current, Historic, KDOT
 Kansas Highway Maps: Current, Historic, KDOT
 Kansas Railroad Maps: Current, 1996, 1915, KDOT and Kansas Historical Society

 
Kansas counties
1868 establishments in Kansas
Populated places established in 1868